Greenhills is an administrative division in eastern Metro Manila, the Philippines. It is an urban barangay in San Juan and is the largest barangay in the city, covering a total area of  that spans over a third of San Juan City's total land area.

Centered on the Greenhills Shopping Center and its adjacent commercial establishments and gated communities, the barangay of Greenhills is considered as a major commercial center of the city and of Metro Manila at large.

The area was initially part of the Hacienda de Mandaluyon (Mandaluyong Estate), the estate holdings of the Augustinian Order. The land was later on sold to businessmen Don Francisco Ortigas and Phil Whitaker, who founded Ortigas & Company, which developed the area into multiple residential subdivisions and its centerpiece shopping center, to which it is known for today.

History

Mandaluyong Estate

The transfer of the Philippines to American rule in 1898 posed several challenges for the American colonial government, one of which was the issue of friar lands, as these religious orders did not pay taxes to the government and refused to sell their lands of their own accord. In order to resolve this problem, the Taft Commission arranged with the Holy See to force the sale of the friar lands to the American colonial government, with the aim of making them available for public use.

As such, the Hacienda de Mandaluyon estate was sold to businessmen Dr. Frank W. Dudley and Don Francisco Ortigas. Dr. Dudley later sold his interest in the estate to Phil C. Whitaker, who with Ortigas founded the company Whitaker and Ortigas. The company would rename itself to Ortigas & Company, as it is known today. The company divided the land into residential subdivision developments now known as Capitol (Kapitolyo), Wack-Wack, Greenhills, Valle Verde and Greenmeadows.

Development of Greenhills
The growth of suburban residential developments in the 1960s is attributed to middle-class and upper-class populations seeking refuge from the busy, urban climate of Manila. With the success of emerging middle-class residential enclaves  such as the PhilAm Life Homes (now PhilAm) in Quezon City and several villages in Makati, which were located along Highway 54 (now EDSA), new residential subdivisions would be developed in the areas between PhilAm and the Makati villages along the highway, such as White Plains, Blue Ridge, and Wack-Wack. The developments were named after famous Greenbelt planned communities in the United States that were developed to allow for the dispersal of the American population in an effort to minimize losses from possible attacks with weapons of mass destruction during the Cold War. 

During this time, Ortigas & Company drafted plans to develop a planned community on the west side of Highway 54, centered around plans for schools, churches, and a centerpiece suburban shopping complex following years of studying planned communities in other countries. The new residential subdivision was named Greenhills, after the suburban Greenbelt community of Greenhills in the US state of Ohio.

The newly-opened Greenhills subdivision covered  of land, which would become divided further into distinct residential subdivisions known as North Greenhills, Greenhills West, and Greenhills East. In 1959, the De La Salle Brothers (now De La Salle Philippines) purchased a  property along Ortigas Avenue, establishing La Salle Green Hills. A year later, the Jesuits purchased a few hectares of land in Little Baguio adjacent to Greenhills as a new location for its Xavier School in 1960, which was then situated along Echague Street in Manila. Of this,  was allocated for the Mary the Queen Parish Church, which moved from its original chapel at Zamora Street in Pasay City in 1963, as well as Immaculate Concepcion Academy-Greenhills, run by the Missionary Sisters of the Immaculate Conception, which moved into the area after transferring from its previous campus in Intramuros, Manila. This was followed by plans in 1966 to construct a shopping center in what would become the Greenhills Shopping Center.

In the 1990s, parts of Greenhills were rezoned as commercial zones, which brought upon commercial development around the Greenhills Shopping Center. A Chili's branch, the second in the country, was opened in 1998 along Missouri Street.

Establishment of Barangay Greenhills
The Greenhills subdivisions were originally located in Mapuntod, a traditional barrio of the municipality of San Juan del Monte (now San Juan, Metro Manila), which was then part of Rizal until it was incorporated into Metro Manila in 1975 through Presidential Decree No. 824.
Prior to 1972, the Greenhills subdivisions were part of the San Juan barrios of West Crame, Addition Hills, and Little Baguio. This was until a petition was made by 278 residents of the Greenhills subdivisions seeking to carve out a new barrio consisting of the Greenhills subdivisions in 1971.

On January 27, 1972, the San Juan Municipal Council approved the creation of Barrio Greenhills through Municipal Resolution No. 42 series of 1972. Following this, the boundaries of West Crame, Addition Hills, and Little Baguio were redefined in Municipal Resolution No. 43 series of 1972. In 1974, Philippine president Ferdinand Marcos Sr. signed Presidential Decree No. 557, renaming all barrios nationwide into barangays. As a result, Barrio Greenhills was renamed as Barangay Greenhills, as it is known today.

Establishment of homeowner associations

In 1972, during the Martial Law period under the second term of President Ferdinand Marcos, Ortigas & Company began setting up homeowner associations for each of its Greenhills subdivisions.

In North Greenhills, the North Greenhills Association (NGA) was founded in December 1972 with journalist and television show host Max Soliven elected as the NGA's first president, and businessman Ray Lorenzana and ears, nose, and throat specialist Dr. Tony Perez serving as its vice presidents. The elections were conducted in a meeting with the subdivision's residents. 

Throughout 1973, the association established a modus vivendi with Ortigas and Company, setting up perimeter walls, guard posts, and gates, transforming North Greenhills into a gated community. Maintenance costs were later turned over to the association in 1975.

Greenhills Grand Prix

From 1971 to 1976, Greenhills was home to the Greenhills Grand Prix, an international motor race. The then-empty streets of the North Greenhills subdivision and a part of Ortigas Avenue served as its  circuit track, with the eastbound service road along Ortigas Avenue serving as its pit stop.

Arrest of Joseph Estrada

In 2001, following the failed impeachment trial of President Joseph Estrada and the Second EDSA Revolution that followed, President Estrada resigned from office on the afternoon of January 20, 2001. This was followed with charges of plunder and perjury being filed against him at the Sandiganbayan, which were initially brought up at the failed impeachment trial. On April 24, 2001, the Sandiganbayan had ordered the arrest of Estrada, his son San Juan mayor Jinggoy Estrada, and other individuals involved in charges of plunder and graft. 

As a result, thousands of loyalists of Estrada had mobilized to Greenhills, using jeepneys and human barricades to block the police and military forces from arresting the former president, who lived inside the North Greenhills subdivision. The arrest warrant was eventually served the next day on April 25, 2001, as Estrada and his son Jinggoy were arrested and brought to Camp Crame for detention and processing. In jail, Estrada made a statement maintaining his innocence and denounced the Arroyo government's efforts to persecute him as a "violation of his human rights". The statement instigated loyalists to converge upon Camp Crame and EDSA, sparking the EDSA III riots from April 25 to 30, 2001.

Proposed opening of Greenhills subdivisions
On July 23, 2019, following President Rodrigo Duterte's plea to government officials to reclaim public roads being used for "private ends", Department of Interior and Local Government secretary Eduardo Año floated the idea of opening up the roads of gated communities to improve traffic flow during rush hours. Following this, San Juan mayor Francis Zamora stated that even though he himself lives in one of Greenhills' gated communities, he would be willing to fight for the proposal to open up these communities if it will help alleviate traffic flow in the city. However, no updates on this proposal have been reported since then.

COVID-19 pandemic

In March 2020, the first two confirmed locally transmitted cases of COVID-19 in the Philippines were reported in Greenhills. The first case was a 62-year-old Filipino man from Cainta that regularly visited the Greenhills Masjid, a mosque within the Greenhills Shopping Center. It was believed that the man had contracted COVID-19 from another individual at the mosque. The disease was passed on to his wife, who became the second local case.

Due to this, the mosque was ordered closed by the San Juan City government and the entire shopping center was ordered to be disinfected and sanitized. The announcement of local transmission of COVID-19 in the area also caused many people to avoid the shopping center and the Greenhills vicinity in fear of catching the disease.

Geography
Greenhills and the adjacent West Crame are the only barangays in San Juan that are not entirely situated on tuff and tuffaceous sedimentary rock, with parts of the barangay being situated on top of pyroclastic flow adobe deposits.

Boundaries
The political borders of Greenhills are defined by the Ermitaño Creek, a tributary of the San Juan River, to which it borders the barangays of Addition Hills, Little Baguio, and Santa Lucia in San Juan to the west and the barangays of East Pasadeña and Corazon De Jesus to the northwest. It has land borders with Quezon City's Barangay Valencia to the northwest and Barangay West Crame to the northeast, Quezon City's Barangay Camp Aguinaldo to the east, and Mandaluyong's Barangay Wack Wack-Greenhills East to the southeast.

Education

 Fountain International School
 Immaculate Conception Academy – Greenhills
 Operation Brotherhood (OB) Montessori
 Instituto Culinario
 Xavier School

Health
 Cardinal Santos Medical Center
 The Health Cube Medical Clinics 
 The Medical City Clinic

Landmarks
 Club Filipino
 Greenhills Shopping Center
 Chapel Of The Holy Family
 Greenhills Masjid
 Music Museum, a concert hall
 Mary the Queen Parish Church

Subdivisions
 Greenhills West
 North Greenhills
 Northeast Greenhills

Transport

Roads 
The six-lane Ortigas Avenue serves as a main thoroughfare for Greenhills, spanning the barangay from end to end, while the four-lane Bonny Serrano Avenue (also known as Santolan Road, and further northwest as Pinaglabanan Street) encircles the barangay's perimeter. The four-lane Wilson Street in Greenhills connects Ortigas Avenue to other adjacent barangays in San Juan City, as well as Mandaluyong City. The two-to-four lane Annapolis Street and Connecticut Street are commercialized areas, as well as roads parallel to Ortigas Avenue, connecting the Greenhills Shopping Center to EDSA.

Painted bike lanes with bollards are also present along Ortigas Avenue and Bonny Serrano Avenue, while unprotected painted bike lanes are present at Wilson Street and the Greenhills Active Playground. The section of Ortigas Avenue within Greenhills also has motorcycle lanes next to its protected bike lanes within San Juan city limits.

The area is served by Bus Route 11 (Taytay-Gilmore) spanning Ortigas Avenue. Jeepney routes also provide intra and inter city transport along Annapolis Street, Wilson Street, and Ortigas Avenue, which brings passengers to and from the San Juan city proper and Ortigas Center.

Railways 
Greenhills is served by the Santolan-Annapolis Station of the MRT Line 3. 
Bus Route 11 (Taytay-Gilmore) passes through the entirety of Ortigas Avenue and connects commuters to Gilmore Station of the LRT Line 2 and Ortigas Station of the MRT Line 3. Bus Route E (EDSA Carousel) also has stops at both MRT stations.

The future MRT Line 4 has been approved and has plans to build two stations serving Greenhills, such as Greenhills and Bonny Serrano.

Other corridors 
A roofed pedestrian alley between The Eisenhower Condominium and One Kennedy Place condominiums along Eisenhower Street also connects the Greenhills area to Road 11 in the adjacent Barangay West Crame.

Government
The seat of government of Greenhills is located at Annapolis Wilshire Plaza along Annapolis Street, a 26-storey building constructed in 2013. Other facilities also include a four-storey multi-purpose building and basketball court along Santolan Road, which was inaugurated on April 24, 2022.

Demographics
Barangay Greenhills is the second most-populated barangay in San Juan City, with a population of 15,212 people according to the 2020 census, up from a population of 14,114 people in the 2015 census.
The earliest record of Barangay Greenhills in the official population census can be found on the 1975 census, the same year that San Juan City was transferred to Metro Manila from the province of Rizal.

References 

Barangays of Metro Manila
San Juan, Metro Manila